The Tag Rugby Trust is a rugby based charity, formed in 2002.  The trust was established to help improve the lives of children in the United Kingdom, but mainly in some of the most underprivileged regions of the world. They currently work with government schools and orphanages in Uganda, Zambia, Zimbabwe, India, Kenya, Mexico and Romania using the game of Tag Rugby as a vehicle.  Volunteers from the U.K. and the underprivileged areas work closely with children in a coaching capacity, which make a life changing difference to all parties involved. In conjunction with the tours the trust continually donates equipment to enhance the development of the Tag Rugby and Rugby in the underprivileged regions.

References

External links
 Tag Rugby Trust

Children's charities based in the United Kingdom